Zabrekve is a settlement in the Municipality of Železniki in the Upper Carniola region of Slovenia. It includes the hamlets of Sveti Mohor (Sankt Hermagor) and Bezovnica.

History
During the Second World War, the Partisans burned the hamlet of Bezovnica on 10 March 1945.

Church
The local church is dedicated to Saints Hermagoras and Fortunatus and was rebuilt in 1973. The original Baroque church was dynamited in the spring of 1944 or in March 1945 and the surviving bell tower burned down in 1972 after being struck by lightning.

Gallery

References

External links
Zabrekve at Geopedia

Populated places in the Municipality of Železniki